Michael Newton may refer to:
Michael Newton (footballer) (born 1987), Australian rules footballer for Melbourne in the Australian Football League
Michael Newton (author) (1951–2021), American author best known for his work on Don Pendleton's Mack Bolan series
Michael Newton (hypnotist) (1931–2016), known for his books about past life regression
Michael Newton (field hockey) (born 1952), American field hockey player
Sir Michael Newton, 4th Baronet (c. 1695–1743), Member of Parliament for Grantham and Beverley
Michael Newton (died 1803), Member of Parliament for Beverley
Michael A. Newton (born 1964), Canadian statistician

See also
Mike Newton (disambiguation)